The UK Albums Chart is a music chart that calculates the best-selling artist albums of the week in the United Kingdom. For the purposes of inclusion in the chart an album is defined by the Official Charts Company (OCC) as being a type of music release that features more than four tracks and lasts longer than 25 minutes.

At the beginning of the 1990s, sales of singles and albums in the United Kingdom were compiled on behalf of the British music industry by Gallup. This continued until 1994, when the contract to compile the UK charts was won by Millward Brown, who took over on 1 February 1994. On 1 July 1998 Chart Information Network (CIN) took over the management of the chart: CIN changed their name to the Official UK Charts Company in October 2001, later shortened to the Official Charts Company in 2008.

Unlike other decades, no decade-end charts for the 1990s for either singles or albums were broadcast on BBC Radio 1 at the end of 1999, and no detailed lists were published in the UK music trade magazine Music Week. Gallup's sales figures were not made available to its successors, and Millward Brown's sales data from 1994 to 1996 were later substantially revised. This made it difficult to obtain accurate sales figures for the decade. Two weeks before the end of the decade Music Week published lists of the top twenty best-selling singles and albums of the 1990s in the UK: this is the only known list of the best-selling albums of the 1990s officially produced by CIN/OCC. The top twenty lists included sales figures, but the subsequent revisions of the data have made the original 1999 figures unreliable, and consequently they have been omitted from the table below.

The biggest-selling album of the 1990s was (What's the Story) Morning Glory? by the British band Oasis. Released in October 1995, the album was the second biggest-selling album of both 1995 and 1996. In second place was Stars by Simply Red, which had achieved the distinction of being the best-selling album in consecutive calendar years (1991 and 1992), the first album to achieve this feat since Bridge over Troubled Water by Simon & Garfunkel, in 1970 and 1971. In third place was Spice by the Spice Girls, which spent 15 weeks at number-one, more than any album during the 90s.

The best-selling compilation was The Immaculate Collection, the first greatest hits album by the American singer/songwriter Madonna: the top twenty included six other greatest hits compilations.

Chart

References

1990s (UK)
1990s in British music
Best-selling albums 1990s
1990s